Martyr Evilasius (died 311) was a pagan priest who tortured a 13-year-old girl who later became Saint Fausta. Realizing her courage, he himself converted to Christianity, an act punishable by death since the people of Cyzicus did not want even one of their people to convert to any religion other than their own.

References

311 deaths
4th-century Romans
4th-century Christian martyrs
Converts to Christianity from pagan religions
Ancient Roman executioners
Saints from Roman Anatolia
Year of birth unknown